Christine J. Johnson was Treasurer for DeKalb County, Illinois, first elected to the office in 1994 and continuing until her resignation in December 2020. She was the longest-serving treasurer in the county's history. Johnson is also a former Republican member of the Illinois Senate, where she represented the 35th legislative district in Boone, DeKalb, Ogle, LaSalle and Winnebago counties from 2011 to 2013. Johnson was elected to her 7th term as Treasurer in 2018.

Early life, education and career

Johnson grew up on a farm and was educated in the DeKalb County area. She received a B.A. in Journalism and Public Relations from Northern Illinois University, which is now part of the district she represents.

Prior to serving as Treasurer, Johnson worked as the Shabbona Lake State Park Office Coordinator and assisted with her family farm operations in Shabbona.

Illinois Senate
Johnson serves on the following Senate Committees: Higher Education (on which she is the Minority Spokesperson), Education, Licensed Activities, and Public Health. Johnson was also appointed to the P-20 Council on Education and Advisory Committee on Medicaid.

2012 election
Following the 2011 redistricting, parts of Johnson's district were combined fellow Republican district.  As a result, she faced a contested primary for the 35th district Republican nomination on March 20, 2012.

Personal life
Johnson resides in Shabbona with her husband Jim. They have one adult son. She has received numerous awards throughout her civic career including the Illinois Country Treasurer Association's Treasurer of the Year Award in 2003 and is the co-founder of the Indian Creek Education Foundation.

References

Living people
Republican Party Illinois state senators
Northern Illinois University alumni
Women state legislators in Illinois
County officials in Illinois
People from DeKalb County, Illinois
1960 births
21st-century American women